Bushuev or Bushuyev (Russian: Бушуев) is a Russian masculine surname originating from the verb bushit (make noise); its feminine counterpart is Bushueva or Bushuyeva. It may refer to the following notable people:
Denis Bushuev (born 1982), Russian football player and manager
Ekaterina Bushueva (1962–2011), Russian draughts player
Mikhail Bushuev (1876–1936), Soviet breeding scientist who developed the Bushuyev cattle
Nikolai Bushuev (born 1985), Russian ice hockey forward 
Viktor Bushuev (1933–2003), Russian weightlifter

References

Russian-language surnames